Fouka or Fukah (Arabic: فوكة) is a locale in the Matrouh Governorate in northern Egypt. Fouka and other communities neighboring Fouka Bay are seen as promising sites for development by the Egyptian real estate and tourism industries.

External links
Egypt Educational Guide - Fukah School

Populated places in Matrouh Governorate

References